SPARC (Scalable Processor Architecture) is a reduced instruction set computer (RISC) instruction set architecture originally developed by Sun Microsystems. Its design was strongly influenced by the experimental Berkeley RISC system developed in the early 1980s. First developed in 1986 and released in 1987, SPARC was one of the most successful early commercial RISC systems, and its success led to the introduction of similar RISC designs from many vendors through the 1980s and 1990s.

The first implementation of the original 32-bit architecture (SPARC V7) was used in Sun's Sun-4 computer workstation and server systems, replacing their earlier Sun-3 systems based on the Motorola 68000 series of processors. SPARC V8 added a number of improvements that were part of the SuperSPARC series of processors released in 1992. SPARC V9, released in 1993, introduced a 64-bit architecture and was first released in Sun's UltraSPARC processors in 1995. Later, SPARC processors were used in symmetric multiprocessing (SMP) and non-uniform memory access (CC-NUMA) servers produced by Sun, Solbourne, and Fujitsu, among others.

The design was turned over to the SPARC International trade group in 1989, and since then its architecture has been developed by its members. SPARC International is also responsible for licensing and promoting the SPARC architecture, managing SPARC trademarks (including SPARC, which it owns), and providing conformance testing. SPARC International was intended to grow the SPARC architecture to create a larger ecosystem; SPARC has been licensed to several manufacturers, including Atmel, Bipolar Integrated Technology, Cypress Semiconductor, Fujitsu, Matsushita and Texas Instruments. Due to SPARC International, SPARC is fully open, non-proprietary and royalty-free.

As of September 2017, the latest commercial high-end SPARC processors are Fujitsu's SPARC64 XII (introduced in 2017 for its SPARC M12 server) and Oracle's SPARC M8 introduced in September 2017 for its high-end servers.

On Friday, September 1, 2017, after a round of layoffs that started in Oracle Labs in November 2016, Oracle terminated SPARC design after completing the M8. Much of the processor core development group in Austin, Texas, was dismissed, as were the teams in Santa Clara, California, and Burlington, Massachusetts.

Fujitsu will also discontinue their SPARC production (has already shifted to producing their own ARM-based CPUs), after two "enhanced" versions of Fujitsu's older SPARC M12 server in 2020–22 (formerly planned for 2021) and again in 2026–27, end-of-sale in 2029, of UNIX servers and a year later for their mainframe and end-of-support in 2034 "to promote customer modernization".

Features
The SPARC architecture was heavily influenced by the earlier RISC designs, including the RISC I and II from the University of California, Berkeley and the IBM 801. These original RISC designs were minimalist, including as few features or op-codes as possible and aiming to execute instructions at a rate of almost one instruction per clock cycle. This made them similar to the MIPS architecture in many ways, including the lack of instructions such as multiply or divide. Another feature of SPARC influenced by this early RISC movement is the branch delay slot.

The SPARC processor usually contains as many as 160 general-purpose registers. According to the "Oracle SPARC Architecture 2015" specification an "implementation may contain from 72 to 640 general-purpose 64-bit" registers. At any point, only 32 of them are immediately visible to software — 8 are a set of global registers (one of which, g0, is hard-wired to zero, so only seven of them are usable as registers) and the other 24 are from the stack of registers. These 24 registers form what is called a register window, and at function call/return, this window is moved up and down the register stack. Each window has 8 local registers and shares 8 registers with each of the adjacent windows. The shared registers are used for passing function parameters and returning values, and the local registers are used for retaining local values across function calls.

The "Scalable" in SPARC comes from the fact that the SPARC specification allows implementations to scale from embedded processors up through large server processors, all sharing the same core (non-privileged) instruction set.  One of the architectural parameters that can scale is the number of implemented register windows; the specification allows from three to 32 windows to be implemented, so the implementation can choose to implement all 32 to provide maximum call stack efficiency, or to implement only three to reduce cost and complexity of the design, or to implement some number between them. Other architectures that include similar register file features include Intel i960, IA-64, and AMD 29000.

The architecture has gone through several revisions. It gained hardware multiply and divide functionality in Version 8. 64-bit (addressing and data) were added to the version 9 SPARC specification published in 1994.

In SPARC Version 8, the floating-point register file has 16 double-precision registers. Each of them can be used as two single-precision registers, providing a total of 32 single-precision registers. An odd-even number pair of double-precision registers can be used as a quad-precision register, thus allowing 8 quad-precision registers. SPARC Version 9 added 16 more double-precision registers (which can also be accessed as 8 quad-precision registers), but these additional registers can not be accessed as single-precision registers. No SPARC CPU implements quad-precision operations in hardware as of 2004.

Tagged add and subtract instructions perform adds and subtracts on values checking that the bottom two bits of both operands are 0 and reporting overflow if they are not.  This can be useful in the implementation of the run time for ML, Lisp, and similar languages that might use a tagged integer format.

The endianness of the 32-bit SPARC V8 architecture is purely big-endian. The 64-bit SPARC V9 architecture uses big-endian instructions, but can access data in either big-endian or little-endian byte order, chosen either at the application instruction (load–store) level or at the memory page level (via an MMU setting).  The latter is often used for accessing data from inherently little-endian devices, such as those on PCI buses.

History
There have been three major revisions of the architecture. The first published version was the 32-bit SPARC Version 7 (V7) in 1986. SPARC Version 8 (V8), an enhanced SPARC architecture definition, was released in 1990.  The main differences between V7 and V8 were the addition of integer multiply and divide instructions, and an upgrade from 80-bit "extended-precision" floating-point arithmetic to 128-bit "quad-precision" arithmetic.  SPARC V8 served as the basis for IEEE Standard 1754-1994, an IEEE standard for a 32-bit microprocessor architecture.

SPARC Version 9, the 64-bit SPARC architecture, was released by SPARC International in 1993.  It was developed by the SPARC Architecture Committee consisting of Amdahl Corporation, Fujitsu, ICL, LSI Logic, Matsushita, Philips, Ross Technology, Sun Microsystems, and Texas Instruments.
Newer specifications always remain compliant with the full SPARC V9 Level 1 specification.

In 2002, the SPARC Joint Programming Specification 1 (JPS1) was released by Fujitsu and Sun, describing processor functions which were identically implemented in the CPUs of both companies ("Commonality"). The first CPUs conforming to JPS1 were the UltraSPARC III by Sun and the SPARC64 V by Fujitsu. Functionalities which are not covered by JPS1 are documented for each processor in "Implementation Supplements".

At the end of 2003, JPS2 was released to support multicore CPUs. The first CPUs conforming to JPS2 were the UltraSPARC IV by Sun and the SPARC64 VI by Fujitsu.

In early 2006, Sun released an extended architecture specification, UltraSPARC Architecture 2005. This includes not only the non-privileged and most of the privileged portions of SPARC V9, but also all the architectural extensions developed through the processor generations of UltraSPARC III, IV IV+ as well as CMT extensions starting with the UltraSPARC T1 implementation:

 the VIS 1 and VIS 2 instruction set extensions and the associated GSR register
 multiple levels of global registers, controlled by the GL register
 Sun's 64-bit MMU architecture
 privileged instructions ALLCLEAN, OTHERW, NORMALW, and INVALW
 access to the VER register is now hyperprivileged
 the SIR instruction is now hyperprivileged

In 2007, Sun released an updated specification, UltraSPARC Architecture 2007, to which the UltraSPARC T2 implementation complied.

In August 2012, Oracle Corporation made available a new specification, Oracle SPARC Architecture 2011, which besides the overall update of the reference, adds the VIS 3 instruction set extensions and hyperprivileged mode to the 2007 specification.

In October 2015, Oracle released SPARC M7, the first processor based on the new Oracle SPARC Architecture 2015 specification.  This revision includes VIS 4 instruction set extensions and hardware-assisted encryption and silicon secured memory (SSM).

SPARC architecture has provided continuous application binary compatibility from the first SPARC V7 implementation in 1987 through the Sun UltraSPARC Architecture implementations.

Among various implementations of SPARC, Sun's SuperSPARC and UltraSPARC-I were very popular, and were used as reference systems for SPEC CPU95 and CPU2000 benchmarks. The 296 MHz UltraSPARC-II is the reference system for the SPEC CPU2006 benchmark.

Architecture 
SPARC is a load/store architecture (also known as a register-register architecture); except for the load/store instructions used to access memory, all instructions operate on the registers, in accordance with the RISC design principles.

Registers 
The SPARC architecture has an overlapping register window scheme. At any instant, 32 general purpose registers are visible. A Current Window Pointer (CWP) variable in the hardware points to the current set. The total size of the register file is not part of the architecture, allowing more registers to be added as the technology improves, up to a maximum of 32 windows in SPARC V7 and V8 as CWP is 5 bits and is part of the PSR register.

In SPARC V7 and V8 CWP will usually be decremented by the SAVE instruction (used by the SAVE instruction during the procedure call to open a new stack frame and switch the register window), or incremented by the RESTORE instruction (switching back to the call before returning from the procedure). Trap events (interrupts, exceptions or TRAP instructions) and RETT instructions (returning from traps) also change the CWP.
For SPARC V9, CWP register is decremented during a RESTORE instruction, and incremented during a SAVE instruction. This is the opposite of PSR.CWP's behavior in SPARC V8. This change has no effect on nonprivileged instructions.

SPARC registers are shown in the figure above.

Instruction formats 

All SPARC instructions occupy a full 32 bit word and start on a word boundary. Four formats are used, distinguished by the first two bits. All arithmetic and logical instructions have 2 source operands and 1 destination operand.

SETHI instruction format copies its 22 bit immediate operand into the high-order 22 bits of any specified register, and sets each of the low-order 10 bits to 0.

Format ALU register, both sources are registers; format ALU immediate, one source is a register and one is a constant in the range -4096 to +4095. Bit 13 selects between them. In both cases, the destination is always a register.

Branch format instructions do control transfers or conditional branches. The icc or fcc field specifies the kind of branch. The 22 bit displacement field give the relative address of the target in words so that conditional branches can go forward or backward up to 8 megabytes. The ANNUL (A) bit is used to get rid of some delay slots. If it is 0 in a conditional branch, the delay slot is executed as usual. If it is 1, the delay slot is only executed if the branch is taken. If it is not taken, the instruction following the conditional branch is skipped.

The CALL instruction uses a 30-bit program counter-relative word offset. This value is enough to reach any instruction within 4 gigabytes of the caller or the entire address space. The CALL instruction deposits the return address in register R15 also known as output register O7.

Just like the arithmetic instructions, the SPARC architecture uses two different formats for load and store instructions. The first format is used for instructions that use one or two registers as the effective address. The second format is used for instructions that use an integer constant as the effective address. 

Most arithmetic instructions come in pairs with one version setting the NZVC condition code bits, and the other does not. This is so that the compiler has a way to move instructions around when trying to fill delay slots.

SPARC V7 does not have multiplication or division instructions, but it does have MULSCC, which does one step of a multiplication testing one bit and conditionally adding the multiplicand to the product. This was because MULSCC can complete over one clock cycle in keeping with the RISC philosophy.

SPARC architecture licensees
The following organizations have licensed the SPARC architecture:

 Afara Websystems
 Bipolar Integrated Technology (BIT)
 Cypress Semiconductor
 European Space Research and Technology Center (ESTEC)
 Fujitsu (and its Fujitsu Microelectronics subsidiary)
 Gaisler Research
 HAL Computer Systems
 Hyundai
 LSI Logic
 Matra Harris Semiconductors (MHS)
 Matsushita Electrical Industrial Co.
 Meiko Scientific
 Metaflow Technologies
 Philips Electronics
 Prisma
 Ross Technology
 Solbourne Computer
 Systems & Processes Engineering Corporation (SPEC)
 TEMIC
 Weitek

Implementations

Notes:

Operating system support
SPARC machines have generally used Sun's SunOS, Solaris, or OpenSolaris including derivatives illumos and OpenIndiana, but other operating systems have also been used, such as NeXTSTEP, RTEMS, FreeBSD, OpenBSD, NetBSD, and Linux.

In 1993, Intergraph announced a port of Windows NT to the SPARC architecture, but it was later cancelled.

In October 2015, Oracle announced a "Linux for SPARC reference platform".

Open source implementations
Several fully open source implementations of the SPARC architecture exist:

 LEON, a 32-bit radiation-tolerant, SPARC V8 implementation, designed especially for space use. Source code is written in VHDL, and licensed under the GPL.
 OpenSPARC T1, released in 2006, a 64-bit, 32-thread implementation conforming to the UltraSPARC Architecture 2005 and to SPARC Version 9 (Level 1). Source code is written in Verilog, and licensed under many licenses.  Most OpenSPARC T1 source code is licensed under the GPL.  Source based on existent open source projects will continue to be licensed under their current licenses.  Binary programs are licensed under a binary software license agreement.
 S1, a 64-bit Wishbone compliant CPU core based on the OpenSPARC T1 design. It is a single UltraSPARC V9 core capable of 4-way SMT. Like the T1, the source code is licensed under the GPL.
 OpenSPARC T2, released in 2008, a 64-bit, 64-thread implementation conforming to the UltraSPARC Architecture 2007 and to SPARC Version 9 (Level 1). Source code is written in Verilog, and licensed under many licenses.  Most OpenSPARC T2 source code is licensed under the GPL. Source based on existing open source projects will continue to be licensed under their current licenses.  Binary programs are licensed under a binary Software License Agreement.

A fully open source simulator for the SPARC architecture also exists:

 RAMP Gold, a 32-bit, 64-thread SPARC Version 8 implementation, designed for FPGA-based architecture simulation. RAMP Gold is written in ~36,000 lines of SystemVerilog, and licensed under the BSD licenses.

Supercomputers
For HPC loads Fujitsu builds specialized SPARC64 fx processors  with a new instruction extensions set, called HPC-ACE (High Performance Computing – Arithmetic Computational Extensions).

Fujitsu's K computer ranked  in the TOP500 June 2011 and November 2011 lists. It combines 88,128 SPARC64 VIIIfx CPUs, each with eight cores, for a total of 705,024 cores—almost twice as many as any other system in the TOP500 at that time. The K Computer was more powerful than the next five systems on the list combined, and had the highest performance-to-power ratio of any supercomputer system. It also ranked  in the Green500 June 2011 list, with a score of 824.56 MFLOPS/W.  In the November 2012 release of TOP500, the K computer ranked , using by far the most power of the top three.  It ranked  on the corresponding Green500 release. Newer HPC processors, IXfx and XIfx, were included in recent PRIMEHPC FX10 and FX100 supercomputers.

Tianhe-2 (TOP500  as of November 2014) has a number of nodes with Galaxy FT-1500 OpenSPARC-based processors developed in China. However, those processors did not contribute to the LINPACK score.

See also
 ERC32 — based on SPARC V7 specification
 Ross Technology, Inc. — a SPARC microprocessor developer during the 1980s and 1990s
 Sparcle — a modified SPARC with multiprocessing support used by the MIT Alewife project
 LEON — a space rated SPARC V8 processor.
 R1000 — a Russian quad-core microprocessor based on SPARC V9 specification
 Galaxy FT-1500 — a Chinese 16-core OpenSPARC based processor

References

External links

 SPARC International, Inc.
  
 SPARC Technical Documents
 OpenSPARC Architecture specification 
 Hypervisor/Sun4v Reference Materials
 Fujitsu SPARC64 V, VI, VII, VIIIfx, IXfx Extensions and X / X+ Specification 
 
 
 
 
 Fujitsu SPARC Roadmap
 SPARC processor images and descriptions
 The Rough Guide to MBus Modules (SuperSPARC, hyperSPARC)
 
 
 A quite an extensive list of operating systems supporting SPARC64 processors

Computer-related introductions in 1985
 
Sun microprocessors
32-bit computers
64-bit computers